Microvoluta superstes is a species of small sea snail, a marine gastropod mollusk in the family Volutomitridae.

Description
The length of the shell attains 5.5 mm.

Distribution
This species occurs in the Atlantic Ocean on the Josephine seamount off Portugal.

References

 Bouchet P. & Kantor Y. 2004. New Caledonia: the major centre of biodiversity for volutomitrid molluscs (Mollusca: Neogastropoda: Volutomitridae). Systematics and Biodiversity 1(4): 467-502
 Y. Kantor, 2010, Checklist of Recent Volutomitridae

External links
 Bouchet, P. & Warén, A. (1985). Revision of the Northeast Atlantic bathyal and abyssal Neogastropoda excluding Turridae (Mollusca, Gastropoda). Bollettino Malacologico. supplement 1: 121-296
 Gofas, S.; Le Renard, J.; Bouchet, P. (2001). Mollusca. in: Costello, M.J. et al. (eds), European Register of Marine Species: a check-list of the marine species in Europe and a bibliography of guides to their identification. Patrimoines Naturels. 50: 180-213

Volutomitridae
Gastropods described in 1985